Karl Wilhelm Isenberg (Barmen, September 5, 1806Stuttgart, October 10, 1864), spelt or known by names Carl Wilhelm Isenberg or Charles William Isenberg or C. W. Isenberg or Carl W. Isenberg or Charles Isenberg, was a German Church Missionary Society missionary and linguist to East Africa and Western India.

Isenberg compiled a dictionary and comprehensive grammar of the Amharic language, including several vocabularies in the Afar and Oromo languages. He also translated the Anglican Book of Common Prayer into Marathi and Amharic and assisted revisions of Bible translations into those languages. He was related to Hermann Hesse.

Biography

Coming from a tinsmith background, he joined the Basel Mission in 1824. After finishing his education, he worked for some time as a teacher of Biblical Greek. Having trained at the Basel Mission seminary in Switzerland and received Anglican orders, he was transferred to Church Missionary Society (CMS) in 1830. Initially he worked in Cairo with Samuel Gobat and studied Aramaic and Arabic. Later on, he was ordained by the Church of England.

Missionary work

East Africa
CMS already sent his first missionaries  Samuel Gobat, a Swiss Lutheran, and Christian Kugler to Abyssinia (present Ethiopia), East Africa in 1829. As Kugler died in Tigre in 1830, his place was supplied by Isenberg as a CMS recruit. Isenberg joined Samuel Gobat, a Swiss Lutheran, in Cairo, Egypt, and studied Amharic and Arabic language.

In 1834[1835], he joined the mission station at Adowa, Ethiopia where they stayed until 1838; however, Gobat was compelled to quit the mission from ill-health at Tigre, also spelt Tigray. After the departure of Gobat, he was joined by his fiancée Henrietta Geerling, Charles Henry Blumhardt, another missionary, and Johann Ludwig Krapf, a German Lutheran and missionary to East Africa, in 1837. They taught and converted a few boys, who were in-turn expelled by the Ethiopian Orthodoxy clergy. He spent his years between 1834 and 1838 at Adowa and Tigray. Unlike Gobat with whom he initially served in Ethiopia, he kept a social and cultural distance from Ethiopians.

From 1838, he and fellow-missionaries faced obstacles thrown in their way by the native priesthood, especially expressed his differences with the beliefs and practices of the Ethiopian Orthodox Church in blunt. Sometimes with direct terms that the Orthodox Christian clergymen found offensive. In March 1838, he was expelled from the country due to his inability to reach any accommodation with Ethiopian Orthodoxy clergymen and unwillingness to accept the Gobat's advice over the location of the mission. In 1839, he along with his new fellow missionaries Johann Ludwig, Krapf, and Carl Heinrich Blumhardt removed the mission station to Shoa, Ethiopia, where he spent for four months before leaving for London; later, he was responsible in mission expulsion from Ethiopia in 1843 forever—In 1842, when Isemberg returned to Shoa, his mission was refused entry forcing him to turn his attention to Tagray again. However, his expulsion in June 1843, effectively ended CMS activities in Ethiopia.

Western India
With no possibility of return to Ethiopia, he was transferred to the CMS mission in Bombay (present day Mumbai), Western India – Bombay Presidency. In Bombay, he devoted most of his missionary work to a settlement for freed African slaves, some of whom returned to Africa after being trained as evangelists.

Having diagnosed as terminally ill, he left India to Germany in 1864; later, died at an age of fifty-eight on 10 October 1864 at Kornthal, near Stuttgart, Germany.

Bibliography

While in London, he published a number of small dictionaries in several Ethiopian languages like Afar(Danakil), Amharic, and Oromo language(Galla) in 1840, 1841, and 1842; however, Oromo language dictionary was based on German manuscript by Krapf. – These dictionaries were considered as the first dictionaries of these languages.

In 1841, he published Dictionary of Amharic, and a comprehensive grammar in 1842. In addition to these, he also published several books to be used in [future] missionary schools, his mission tried to establish in Ethiopia—The texts which Isenberg wrote in Amharic plays a role in early Amharic literature. For evangelizing the natives, he translated Anglican
Book of Common Prayer into Marathi and Amharic language in 1842, including his missionary efforts in revising Bible translations into local languages of respective missionary stations—Marathi and Amharic languages.

In 1843, in association with his colleague Johann Ludwig Krapf, he published at London a memoir of his time in Ethiopia entitled Journals of Isenberg and Krapf, detailing their proceedings in the Kingdom of Shoa and journeys in other parts of Abyssinia in the years 1839, 1840, 1841, and 1842. This journal contains the information about the theological controversies that were raging in the Ethiopian church of those times, including the details about the people, politics, and its geography.

Works
 Grammar of the Amharic language.
 Dictionary of the Amharic language.
 A small vocabulary of the Dankali language.
 Dictionary of the Amharic Language in Two Parts, Amharic and English, and English and Amharic.
 Journals of the Rev. Messrs. Isenberg and Krapf, missionaries of the Church missionary society:detailing their proceedings in the kingdom of Shoa, and journeys in other parts of Abyssinia, in the years 1839, 1840, 1841, and 1842.
 Vocabulary of the Galla Language.
 Abyssinia and the Evangelical Missions. 1844.

See also
 Society for Missions to Africa and the East
 Johann Ludwig Krapf in Ethiopia

References

External links
 Liturgia, seu Liber Precum Communium, et Administrationis Sacramentorum, Aliorumque Rituum et Cæremoniarum Ecclesiæ, juxta Usum Ecclesiæ Anglicanæ et Hibernicæ unà cum Psalterio, seu Libro Psalmorum cui accedit Forma et Modus Creandi, Ordinandi, et Consecrandi Episcopos, Presbyteros, et Diaconos – Isenberg's 1842 translation of the Book of Common Prayer, digitized by Richard Mammana
 Eclectic magazine: foreign literature, Volume 7; Volume 70 – Authors:John Holmes Agnew, Walter Hilliard Bidwell – p. 405
  Journals of the Rev. Messrs. Isenberg and Krapf, missionaries of the Church – Authors: Charles William Isenberg, Johann Ludwig Krapf, James MacQueen, Church Missionary Society

1806 births
1864 deaths
Anglican missionaries in Ethiopia
Translators of the Bible into Amharic
Translators of the Bible into Marathi
German Anglican missionaries
Colonial people of German East Africa
Anglican missionaries in India
19th-century translators
German expatriates in India
Missionary linguists